Marie Shotwell (March 21, 1880 – September 18, 1934) was an American actress of the stage and screen.

Biography
Shotwell was in motion pictures beginning in 1915 with roles in God's Witness, The Taming of Mary, Under Southern Skies, and The Tale of the C. Her film career continued until the late 1920s, including Sally of the Sawdust (1925) with W.C. Fields; her final appearances  were in Running Wild (1927) and One Woman To Another (1927).

She was married to a former Savannah, Georgia, police chief, William G. Austin. Shotwell divorced Austin in 1916.

In 1922 Shotwell became executrix for the estate of her friend, New York City public school teacher Marie J. Pearson. Shotwell was sued by an undertaker for $245, the amount of the burial bill. 

The actress died of a cerebral hemorrhage in 1934 after she was stricken while she was working in the Astoria, New York Film Studios. Shotwell was working on the George M. Cohan movie Gambling. She was fifty-four years old.

Partial filmography

References
Hammond, Indiana Times, Actress Sued By Undertaker For Burial Bill, October 17, 1922, Page 4.
Los Angeles Times, Marie Shotwell, Actress, Dies, September 19, 1934, Page 3.
Ogden, Utah Standard, Mrs. William G. Austin, May 5, 1916, Page 7.

Notes

External links

1917 cover of periodical(archived)

1880 births
1934 deaths
20th-century American actresses
American film actresses
American silent film actresses
American stage actresses